Laud Anoo Konadu (born May 25, 1992) known professionally as Dancegod Lloyd, is a Ghanaian dancer, dance coach, and choreographer. He is a co-founder of the dance school, DWP academy. In 2020, he performed in Beyonce's Already music video, which featured Shatta Wale.

Early life 
Laud Anoo Konadu was born on 25 May 1992 in a town called Kibi in the Eastern region of Ghana. He had his basic school education at Solidarity International School and later attended Presbyterian Boys Senior High School in Accra. He is born to Mr. Theophilus Konadu, his father and Mrs. Agnes Konadu, his mother.

Career 
He has performed in several music videos, including Already by Beyonce, See Brother by Patoranking, and Shoo by Kwamz and Flava.

In 2017, Dancegod and his manager and dance partner, Afro Beast, initiated a charitable group called "Dance With Purpose Academy," which was aimed at helping young, talented dancers on the street. Whoiswriter.com claims that, he has dancers in likes of; Endurance Grand and Afronitaaa (Stargyal). These are the only known dancers he has; there are many others out there, but only the two are known.

Original dances 
Shoo — is a song by Kwamz and Flava but Dancegod Lloyd is credited to have created the dance steps.

Discography

Singles 

 "Sika" featuring Medikal
 "Corner Der" X DWP Academy, Afrobeast
 "Eheati" X DWP Academy, Afrobeast

Music video appearances 

 "Already" by Beyonce, Shatta Wale, Major Lazor (2019)

References 

Living people
Ghanaian dancers
1992 births